Koogi may refer to:

 Koogi, Harju County, village in Jõelähtme Parish, Harju County, Estonia
 Koogi, Tartu County, village in Tartu County, Estonia
 Koogi, author of the manhwa Killing Stalking